Annelies Reinhold (5 January 19176 January 2007) was an Austrian film actress. She actively starred in films over a duration of 10 years.

Selected filmography
 The Three Codonas (1940)
 Violanta (1942)
 Paracelsus (1943)
 The Roedern Affair (1944)
 Night of the Twelve (1949)
 Duel with Death (1949)
 A Heart Beats for You (1949)
 King for One Night (1950)

References

Bibliography 
 Rolf Giesen. Nazi Propaganda Films: A History and Filmography. McFarland, 2003.

External links 
 

1917 births
2007 deaths
Austrian film actresses
People from Merano